The 4th National Television Awards ceremony was held at the Royal Albert Hall on 27 October 1998 and was hosted by Trevor McDonald.

Awards

References

National Television Awards
National Television Awards
National Television Awards
1998 in London
National Television Awards
National Television Awards